Space for the Earth is the fifteenth studio album by English progressive and psychedelic rock band Ozric Tentacles. The album was released on 9 October 2020 through the Kscope label. Written, recorded and produced by frontman Ed Wynne in his Blue Bubble studio in Scotland, the album features his son Silas Neptune on keyboards and Balázs Szende on drums, as well as several additional musicians many of which are former Ozric Tentacles members. The album was officially announced on 22 July 2020 followed by the release of the single "Humboldt Currant".

Track listing

Personnel
Ozric Tentacles
Ed Wynne – guitars, bass, keyboards, programming, engineering
Silas Neptune – keyboards, synthesizer
Balázs Szende – drums

Additional musicians
John Egan – kaval
Nick Van Gelder – drums
Gregoor "Gracerooms" Van Der Loo – synthesizer
Paul Hankin – percussion
Joie Hinton – keyboards

References

2020 albums
Ozric Tentacles albums
Kscope albums